Takatomo Enoki from the Nippon Telegraph and Telephone Corporation, NTT, Atsugi-shi, Kanagawa, Japan was named Fellow of the Institute of Electrical and Electronics Engineers (IEEE) in 2013 for contributions to compound semiconductor high speed integrated circuits for optical and wireless communication systems.

References

Fellow Members of the IEEE
Living people
Year of birth missing (living people)
Place of birth missing (living people)